Asín is a municipality located in the Cinco Villas comarca of the province of Zaragoza, Aragon, Spain, located a few kilometers west of Orés. According to the 2004 census (INE), the municipality has a population of 106 inhabitants.

References 

Municipalities in the Province of Zaragoza